Moten is a surname. Notable people with the name include:

Bennie Moten (1894–1935), American jazz pianist and band leader born in Kansas City, Missouri
Benny Moten (1916–1977), American jazz bassist
Eddie Moten (born 1981), American football cornerback for the Dallas Vigilantes of Arena Football 1
Eric Moten (born 1968), former offensive guard in the NFL
Etta Moten Barnett (1901–2004), American actress and contralto vocalist
Fred Moten (born 1962), American poet and scholar
Lawrence Moten (born 1972), retired American professional basketball player
Mariyah Moten a Pakistani Model
Patrick Moten (born 1957), musician and songwriter
Wendy Moten (born 1965), American singer